Diego Martín Barboza González (born 9 January 1991) is a Uruguayan footballer who plays as a defender.

Career

Club
On 5 August 2021, Ararat-Armenia announced the signing of Barboza from Enosis Neon Paralimni.

References

External links
 

1991 births
Living people
Uruguayan footballers
Uruguayan expatriate footballers
Association football defenders
Rampla Juniors players
Huracán F.C. players
Montevideo Wanderers F.C. players
Correcaminos UAT footballers
Enosis Neon Paralimni FC players
Uruguayan Primera División players
Uruguayan Segunda División players
Ascenso MX players
Cypriot First Division players
Footballers from Montevideo